Los Angeles Rampage is an American women's soccer team, founded in 2007. The team is a member of the Women's Premier Soccer League, the third tier of women's soccer in the United States and Canada. The team plays in the South Division of the Pacific Conference.

The team plays its home games at John Elway Stadium on the campus of Granada Hills Charter High School in the Granada Hills-San Fernando Valley neighborhood of Los Angeles, California. The club's colors are navy blue and white.

Players

Current roster

Notable former players

Year-by-year

Honors

Competition History

Coaches
  Emanuel Martins 2008–present
  Louise Lieberman, Director of Women's Coaching (2005), Director of Coaching (2006–09).

Stadia
 John Elway Stadium; Granada Hills, California 2008–present
 Arroyo Vista Park; Moorpark, California 2008 (1 game)

Average Attendance

References

External links
 Official Site
 WPSL Los Angeles Rampage page

Women's Premier Soccer League teams
Women's soccer clubs in California
R
2007 establishments in California
Association football clubs established in 2007